Silver Oak may refer to:

Grevillea robusta, a tree not closely related to the true oaks, Quercus, native to eastern coastal Australia
Brachylaena discolor, a flowering plant in the aster family
Silver Oak Cellars
Silver Oak College of Engineering and Technology, Ahmedabad, Gujarat, India
Silver Oaks – The School of Hyderabad, India